The Tadini Madonna is a tempera painting of the Madonna and Child of about 1450 by Jacopo Bellini, now in the Accademia Tadini in Lovere, Italy. It was originally on a panel support but was transferred to a canvas support in 1900 by Luigi Cavenaghi. 

It is thought to have originally been in Santa Maria degli Angeli, an Augustinian monastery in Murano.

References

Bibliography
 A. Di Lorenzo, in Le muse e il principe. Arte di corte nel Rinascimento padano, catalogo della mostra, a cura di A. Di Lorenzo et al., Modena, Franco Cosimo Panini 1991, pp. 294-297, n. 75
 A. Mazzotta, M. Albertario e R. Grazioli, in Restituzioni 2018. Tesori d’arte restaurati, catalogo della mostra, a cura di C. Bertelli, G. Bonsanti, Venezia, Marsilio, 2018, pp. 298-306, n. 30
  p

External links
 
 

Paintings by Jacopo Bellini
1450 paintings
Paintings in the Province of Bergamo
Bellini, Jacopo